The Columbia 34 Mark II is an American sailboat that was designed by William H. Tripp Jr. as a coastal cruising sailboat and first built in 1970.

The Columbia 34 Mark II's hull molds were later used to develop the Coronado 35 and also the Hughes 36 and the Hughes-Columbia 36.

Production
The Columbia 34 Mark II was a new design built by Columbia Yachts in the United States as a follow-on to the unrelated Columbia 34. The company produced 352 examples of the Mark II between 1970 and 1975, but it is now out of production.

Design
The Columbia 34 Mark II is a recreational keelboat, built predominantly of fiberglass, with wood trim. It has a masthead sloop rig, a spooned raked stem, a reverse transom, an internally mounted spade-type rudder controlled by a tiller or optional wheel and a fixed fin keel, or optional shoal draft keel or stub keel with a centerboard.

Accommodation includes a bow "V"-berth, a main cabin dinette table that drops to form a double berth, a main cabin settee for a single berth, a quarter berth opposite the galley. The galley includes a stainless steel sink, four teak drawers, a gimballed two-burner alcohol-fired stove, a top-loading icebox. Refrigeration and pressurized hot and cold water were factory options. There is a main cabin navigation table that slides out of the way when not in use. Engine access requires removing the companionway steps. An anchor locker is fitted in the bow.

Variants
Columbia 34 Mark II
This model was introduced in 1970 and produced until 1975. It displaces  and carries  of iron ballast.
Columbia 34 Mark II CB
This model features a short keel and centerboard. It was introduced in 1970 and produced until 1975. It displaces  and carries  of lead ballast. The boat is fitted with a Universal Atomic 4 diesel engine.
Columbia 34 Mark II SD
This shoal draft keel model was introduced in 1970 and eventually replaced the Mark II CB in production. It has the same short keel as the "CB", but lacks the retractable centerboard. It displaces  and carries  of ballast. The boat has a Universal Atomic 4 diesel engine.

Operational history
A review by Dave Smith notes, "When the ... Columbia 34 MKII first came out it ... it was billed as "The Seven Sleeper for Seven Footers", and "The room of a 38 footer for the price you would expect in a 32 footer". Both slogans capture the allure of the MKII Columbia 34." He notes, " The boat does not have a generous sail plan (about the same sail area as a Columbia 30), so it doesn’t perform well in light air. With the high freeboard, it isn’t as good up wind as some other designs, and it likes to be reefed early when going to windward. A cute little characteristic of the 34 is that the galley and head sinks slip below the waterline when the boat is heeled beyond 15 degrees, so you learn to close these through hull fittings before sailing or risk letting in a lot of water."

See also
List of sailing boat types

Related development
Coronado 35
Hughes 36
Hughes-Columbia 36

Similar sailboats
Beneteau 331
Beneteau First Class 10
C&C 34
C&C 34/36
Catalina 34
Coast 34
Creekmore 34
Crown 34
CS 34
Express 34
Hunter 34
San Juan 34
Sea Sprite 34
Sun Odyssey 349
Tartan 34 C
Tartan 34-2
Viking 34

References

External links

Keelboats
1970s sailboat type designs
Sailing yachts
Sailboat type designs by William H. Tripp Jr.
Sailboat types built by Columbia Yachts